The 2011 Constellation Cup was the 2nd Constellation Cup series played between Australia and New Zealand. The series featured five netball test matches. The series was effectively two separate series played before and after the 2011 World Netball Championships. In June 2011, Australia traveled to New Zealand for the New World Series. The Australia team was coached by Norma Plummer and captained by Natalie von Bertouch. New Zealand were coached by Ruth Aitken and captained by Temepara George and Casey Williams. Australia won the opening test before New Zealand leveled the series at 1–1.  In October 2011, New Zealand traveled to Australia for the Holden Netball Test Series. This time the Australia team was coached by Lisa Alexander and captained by Catherine Cox. New Zealand also saw a change in their leadership with Waimarama Taumaunu taking over as head coach and Laura Langman taking on the captaincy. After winning the third test, New Zealand led the series 2–1. However, Australia won the final two tests to win the series 3–2.

Squads

Australia

 
Notes
  Natalie von Bertouch captained Australia during the New World Netball Series in June. Catherine Cox captained Australia during the Holden Netball Test Series in October.
  Norma Plummer was Australia's head coach during the New World Netball Series in June. Lisa Alexander was Australia's head coach during the Holden Netball Test Series in October.
  Australia support team for during the Holden Netball Test Series in October.

Debuts
 Chelsea Pitman made her senior debut for Australia in the 1st test on 9 June.
 Sharni Layton made her senior debut for Australia in the 2nd test on 12 June.

New Zealand

 
 
 
Notes
  Temepara George captained New Zealand for the first test and Casey Williams captained New Zealand for the second test. Laura Langman captained New Zealand for the Holden Netball Test Series.
  Ruth Aitken was New Zealand's head coach during the New World Netball Series in June. Waimarama Taumaunu was New Zealand's head coach during the Holden Netball Test Series in October.

Matches

New World Netball Series
In June 2011, Australia traveled to New Zealand for the New World Series. The Australia team was coached by Norma Plummer and captained by Natalie von Bertouch. New Zealand were coached by Ruth Aitken and captained by Casey Williams. However, Williams missed the first test due to injury and New Zealand were captained by Temepara George. Australia won the opening test before New Zealand leveled the series at 1–1. Both teams used this series to prepare for the 2011 World Netball Championships.

First test

Second test

Holden Netball Test Series
In October 2011, New Zealand traveled to Australia for the Holden Netball Test Series. This time the Australia team was coached by Lisa Alexander and, in the absence of an injured Natalie von Bertouch, were captained by Catherine Cox. New Zealand also saw a change in their leadership with Waimarama Taumaunu taking over as head coach and Laura Langman taking on the captaincy. After winning the third test, New Zealand led the series 2–1. However, Australia won the final two tests to win the series 3–2.

Third test

Fourth test

Fifth test

References

2011
2011 in New Zealand netball
2011 in Australian netball
June 2011 sports events in New Zealand
October 2011 sports events in Australia